is a Japanese manga series written and illustrated by Masaki Kasahara. It was serialized in Shueisha's seinen manga magazine  Weekly Young Jump from August 2013 to June 2017. A sequel, titled Shin Gunjō Senki, written by Kasahara and illustrated by Ajichika, was serialized in the same magazine from January 2021 to March 2022. A live-action film adaptation, titled Brave: Gunjō Senki, premiered in March 2021.

Media

Manga
Gunjō Senki is written and illustrated by Masaki Kasahara. It was serialized in Shueisha's Weekly Young Jump from August 29, 2013, to June 15, 2017. Shueisha collected its chapters in seventeen tankōbon volumes, released from January 17, 2014, to August 18, 2017.

A sequel, titled , written by Masaki Kasahara and illustrated by Ajichika, was serialized in Weekly Young Jump from January 7, 2021. to March 17, 2022. Shueisha collected its chapters in five volumes, released from March 4, 2021, to April 19, 2022.

Volume list

Gunjō Senki

Shin Gunjō Senki

Live-action film
A live-action film adaptation, titled  premiered in Japan on March 21, 2021. The film stars Mackenyu as Aoi Nishino, Haruma Miura as Ieyasu Tokugawa, Kenichi Matsuyama as Oda Nobunaga and Hirona Yamazaki as Haruka Seno. It will be directed by Katsuyuki Motohiro, with scripts by Masahiro Yamaura and Toru Yamamoto, and music composed by Yugo Kanno. Uverworld performed the film's song theme "HOURGLASS".

Reception
As of November 2019, the Gunjō Senki manga had over 1 million copies in circulation.

References

External links
 
 
 

Action anime and manga
Historical anime and manga
Seinen manga
Shueisha manga
Toho films
Japanese action films